Middle Granville is a hamlet in Washington County, New York, United States. Middle Granville has a post office with ZIP code 12849.

References

Hamlets in Washington County, New York
Hamlets in New York (state)